The Lindo family was a Sephardic Jewish merchant and banking family, which rose to prominence in medieval Spain.

Portugal 
Manuel Lindo was a cosmographer and Chair of the Astronomy department at the University of Coimbra in the 16th century. He published a nautical guide in manuscript form in 1539. He was a dear friend of Amatus Lusitanus, who described him as the eminent astronomer.  He worked with Pedro Nunes, Abraham Zacuto, José Vizinho, João Faras to build instruments that made Europe's worldwide expansion possible.

Francisco Lindo, was arrested for Judaism and Heresy in Évora, on the 12th of August 1644. 

Francisco's son Joao Rodrigues Lindo married Contance Nunes of Guarda and lived in Campo Maior. Their son, Isaac (Lourenco), was born in Badajoz in 1638. He became a merchant in Tenerife, where he and his wife arrested by the Inquisition in 1656. After being held without trial for two years, Isaac and his wife were penanced and released. The family lived in France before settling in London in around 1670.   

His brother, Antonio Rodriguez Lindo, merchant at Lisbon , was arrested for Judaism Oct. 9 , 1660 , condemned to public Abjuration at the Auto-da-fé of Lisbon , Sept. 17 , 1662.

United Kingdom 
One of the oldest and most esteemed of London Sephardic families, it traces its descent to Isaac Lindo. 

Isaac visited London in the early 1650's and was married there around 1653.  Antonio Fernandez Carvajal and Abraham Chilon, who commissioned one of the first brokers medals in 1655, were his maternal uncles.

He settled in London around 1670 where he became an elder of Bevis Marks Synagogue, one of the first Jewish brokers of the Royal Exchange, London in 1681 and a signatory of the *Ascamot of 1694. His children included:

 Alexander Lindo (1666-1727) became a sworn broker in 1683, married Rachel Lopes Pereira, who was a sister or cousin of Diego Pereira d'Aguilar, in 1708 and had six children.
 Elias Lindo (1690-1727), sworn broker, commissioned the Lindo lamp in 1708 to celebrate his marriage to Rachel Lopes Ferreira with whom he had six children.
For nine successive generations members of the family were sworn brokers of the city of London, until the registration of sworn brokers was abolished in 1886:

 Issac Lindo (1638-1712): became a sworn broker in 1681, married Leah Lopes and had issue including:
 Elias Lindo (1690-1727): sworn broker, married to Rachel Lopes Ferreira and had issue including:
 Isaac Lindo (1709-1766): sworn broker, married Bathseba Abarbanel and had issue including:
 Elias Lindo: sworn broker, married Grace Lumbroso de Mattos and had issue including:
 Moses Lindo (1760-1837): sworn broker, married Sarah DaCosta and had issue including:
 Moses DaCosta Lindo (1784-1866): Sworn broker, married Leah Norsa and had issue:
 Sarah DaCosta Lindo (1814-) who married her cousin Nathaneel Lindo (1810-1889), sworn broker and solicitor, and had issue including:
 Joseph Norsa Lindo (1837-), sworn broker, who the last member of the family to pay for a "Jew Broker medal" in 1858, married Esther Benoliel and had issue including:
 Moses Albert Norsa Lindo (1862-1933): sworn broker 

Six of their brokers medals are on display at the Museum of London. The Lindos were closely related to many other "cousinhood" families of note in Britain, including the Mocatta, Goldsmid and the Montefiores.

Members of the family have been active in the affairs of the Sephardi community. 

Moses Lindo (1760-1837) served as President of Board of Deputies of British Jews from 1817 to 1829. Moses' brother, David Abarbanel Lindo, married Sarah Lumbroso de Mattos and had no less than eighteen children, many of whom married into well known Sephardic families.  

David's son Nathaneel Lindo (1810-1889) was a City solicitor who operated the firm Lindo & Co., which had long acted as solicitors for the Spanish Portuguese Synagogue and the Italian consulate in London, a tradition which his sons: Gabriel (1838-1908) and Arthur Lindo (1839-1905) continued.

David Lindo Alexander, was President of Board of Deputies of British Jews from 1903 to 1917.

In 1937, Frank Charles Lindo (1872-1938), a great grandson of David Abarbanel Lindo, donated funds to build the Lindo Wing at St Mary's Hospital, London.

Jamaica 

Alexandre Lindo migrated to Kingston, Jamaica from Bordeaux in 1765 and became an important merchant, banker and planter. Per Stanley Mirvis' The Jews of Eighteenth-Century Jamaica: A Testamentary History of a Diaspora in Transition, Lindo "was perhaps the most notorious Jamaican Jewish slave trader, absentee planter, and moneylender at the end of the eighteenth century..."  

By 1780 he was operating Lindo's Wharf on Princess Street in Kingston. He owned multiple transatlantic vessels and traded in all types of merchandise. For example, one of his vessels, the Esther Lindo, described by Lloyd's Register as a constant trader on the London-Jamaica run, cleared Jamaica for London on May 28th, 1790 laden with sugar, cotton, pimento, Nicaragua wood, coffee, ginger, rum, wine, silver, sweetmeats, tamarinds, balsam, copper, castor oil, and tortoise shell.  He owned numerous properties including Greenwich Park (the first steam powered plantation in Jamaica) and Pleasant Hill, a large coffee plantation.   

He supplied André Rigaud during the War of Knives and was close to a French jew who was executed while trying to spark a slave revolt in Jamaica in 1799. He made large loans to the French Government during the Peace of Amiens, negotiated by Charles Leclerc, to finance the Saint-Domingue expedition. When Britain declared war on France, on May 18, 1803, ending the Peace of Amiens, Lindo attempted to draw a draft in Paris, but the debt was dishonoured and Lindo was threatened with arrest. 

His eldest son Abraham Alexander Lindo, was put in charge of the family business in Jamaica and Alexandre moved to London, where he was involved in trading, banking and insurance. He leased part of Roehampton estate called Putney Spot from Benjamin Goldsmid while constructing a mansion in Finsbury Square. 

He was elected Parnas of Bevis Marks Synagogue in 1805. That year his sons subdivided Kingston Pen into small lots which then formed a mixed race working class township known as Lindo's Town. Lindo’s Town included areas now known as Trenchtown, Denham Town and Tivoli Gardens.  

He died at Finsbury Square on March 12, 1812. He had two wives and at least 26 children. His grandchildren included:

 Alexander Joseph Lindo: Jamaican merchant, planter, Member of House of Assembly of Jamaica and Custos rotulorum of St. Mary 
 Frederick Lindo:  Merchant and Member of the Legislative Council of Jamaica
 David Lindo (chemist): Jamaican Merchant and Chemist
 Charles McLarty Morales: Speaker of House of Assembly of Jamaica (1849–61)
 Isaac Mendes Belisario: a Jamaican artist
 Mark Prager Lindo: a Dutch prose writer
 Philip Moravier Lindo: a British portrait and genre painter of the Düsseldorf School and an entrepreneur in the Netherlands
 Jonas Levien: a Member of the Victorian Legislative Assembly and Minister of Mines & Agriculture

Prominent descendants of Isaac Lindo

Business, politics and law 
Moses Lindo: English planter and merchant in South Carolina, Inspector-General of Indigo, Drugs, and Dyes
Elias Lindo: Royal Exchange Broker
Abraham Alexander Lindo: Jamaican merchant and planter
David Lindo Alexander: English barrister and community leader
Lionel Lindo Alexander: British political and communal worker
Elias Mocatta: British Merchant & Financier, significant in early credit history of Venezuela
Mattias Mackinlay Zapiola: Governor of Santa Cruz, Argentina
Charles McLarty Morales: Speaker of House of Assembly of Jamaica (1849–61)
Alexander Joseph Lindo: Jamaican merchant, planter, Member of House of Assembly of Jamaica and Custos rotulorum of St. Mary 
Jonas Levien: Australian politician, a member of the Victorian Legislative Assembly, Minister of Mines & Agriculture
Eduard and Franz Hernsheim: Founders of Hernsheim & Co, a German trading company in the western Pacific
Cecil Vernon Lindo: Jamaican banker, industrialist, planter and philanthropist
Stanley Alexander Lindo: Jamaican banker, planter, industrialist in Costa Rica
Percy Lindo: Jamaican banker, planter, industrialist and Member of the Legislative Council of Jamaica
Roy Lindo: Jamaican industrialist, financier and Member of the Legislative Council of Jamaica
Alan Mocatta: was a British Judge
Dean Lindo: attorney and politician in Belize, one of the principal founders of the United Democratic Party
Hugh Shearer: 3rd Prime Minister of Jamaica
Dean Barrow: prime minister of Belize from 2008 until 2020 and as leader of Belize's United Democratic Party
Henry Laurence Lindo: pioneering Jamaican civil servant
Yarrow baronets: created by George V on 29 January 1916 for the shipbuilder and engineer Alfred Yarrow, founding Chairman of Yarrow & Co
Coningsby Disraeli: was a British Conservative politician, and MP for Altrincham.
John Scott-Ellis, 9th Baron Howard de Walden: was a British peer, landowner, and a Thoroughbred racehorse owner/breeder
Samuel baronets of Nevern Square
Lawrence Kadoorie, Baron Kadoorie: Hong Kong industrialist & hotelier
John Eccles, 2nd Viscount Eccles: British Conservative Peer and businessman
Valdemar Riise: Pharmacist
Lea Mendes (1809-1849) was the wife of Samuel Teixeira de Mattos, founder of Teixeira de Mattos (bank)
Louis Frederik Teixeira de Mattos: civil engineer, author in the field of water management and Co-Founder of the Christian Historical Union

Arts and entertainment 
 Mark Prager Lindo: was a Dutch prose writer
 Philip Moravier Lindo: was a British portrait and genre painter of the Düsseldorf School and an entrepreneur in the Netherlands
 Chris Blackwell: is an English businessman and former record producer, and the founder of Island Records
 Stephen Poliakoff: is a British playwright, director and screenwriter
 James Basevi: was a British-born art director and special effects expert.
 Henri Teixeira de Mattos: was a 19th-century Dutch sculptor
 Joseph Mendes da Costa: was a Dutch sculptor and teacher
 Joseph Teixeira de Mattos: was a Dutch painter
 Carolina Anna Teixeira de Mattos: was a Dutch painter
 Olga Lindo: was an English actress
 Isaac Mendes Belisario: Jamaican artist
 Archie Lindo: Jamaican photographer, actor, author, playwright, and radio show broadcaster
 David Yarrow:  is a British fine-art photographer, conservationist and author
 Damian Lewis:  is an English actor

Science, Medicine and Education 
 Miriam Mendes Belisario: English writer and educator
 Abigail Lindo: British lexicographer
 Jacob Mendes Da Costa: was an American physician 
 Juda Lion Palache: was a professor of Semitic languages at the University of Amsterdam and a leader of the Portuguese Jewish community 
 Charles Gabriel Seligman: British Physician
 Sir Martyn Poliakoff:  is a British chemist, working on gaining insights into fundamental chemistry
 John Ziman: was a British-born New Zealand physicist and humanist who worked in the area of condensed matter physics.
 David Lindo (chemist): Jamaican Merchant and Chemist
 Arthur Lindo Patterson: British X-ray crystallographer
 Lindo Ferguson: New Zealand ophthalmologist, university professor and medical school dean.
 Elias Hayyim Lindo: English author and historian
 Hector Lindo Fuentes: Salvadoran historian

Other 
David Abarbanel Lindo: English communal worker who performed the circumcision of Benjamin Disraeli
Isaac Juda Palache: was grand rabbi of the Portuguese Sephardic community of Amsterdam from 1900 to 1926
David Mocatta: British architect
 George Basevi: British architect
 J. P. Basevi: was a British army engineer who conducted one of the first gravimetric surveys in India using a pendulum
 Povl Baumann: Danish Architect
 Isaac Anne Lindo:  Dutch engineer
 Marie-Louise Johanna Daisy Teixeira de Mattos: was the Chief Court Mistress for Juliana of the Netherlands
 Blanche Blackwell: Jamaican heiress
 Norman Joseph Levien: New Zealand Army Officer and a foundation member of the New Zealand Army Ordnance Corps
 Edwin Louis Teixeira de Mattos: Dutch Bobsledder

Notable people with the surname include: 

 Moses Lindo: English planter and merchant in South Carolina, Inspector-General of Indigo, Drugs, and Dyes
 Abraham Alexander Lindo: Jamaican merchant and planter
 Juan Lindo: President of the Republic of El Salvador (1841-1842) and of the Republic of Honduras (1847-1852)
 David Abarbanel Lindo: was a English communal worker
 Elias Hayyim Lindo: was a British Sephardic Jewish merchant, author and historian
 David Lindo Alexander: English barrister and community leader
Lionel Lindo Alexander: British political and communal worker
Cecil Vernon Lindo: Jamaican banker, industrialist, planter and philanthropist
Percy Lindo: Jamaican banker, planter, industrialist and Member of the Legislative Council of Jamaica
Roy Lindo: Jamaican industrialist, financier and Member of the Legislative Council of Jamaica
Stanley Alexander Lindo: Jamaican banker, planter, industrialist in Costa Rica
Blanche Blackwell: Jamaican heiress
Archie Lindo: Jamaican photographer, actor, author, playwright, and radio show broadcaster
Dean Lindo: attorney and politician in Belize, one of the principal founders of the United Democratic Party
Henry Laurence Lindo: pioneering Jamaican civil servant
Hugo Lindo: Salvadorian writer, diplomat, politician, and lawyer
Richard Lindo Fuentes: was a Salvadoran writer and poet
Hector Lindo Fuentes: Salvadoran historian
Delroy Lindo (born 1952), British-American actor
Earl Lindo (1953–2017), Jamaican reggae musician
Elvira Lindo (born 1962), Spanish journalist and writer
Olga Lindo: was an English actress
Mark Prager Lindo: was a Dutch prose writer
 Philip Moravier Lindo: was a British portrait and genre painter of the Düsseldorf School and an entrepreneur in the Netherlands
Isaac Anne Lindo:  Dutch engineer
José Alexandre Alves Lindo, (born 1973) Brazilian footballer
Jack Ruby (record producer)
Kashief Lindo (born c.1978), Jamaican reggae singer
Big Narstie: is a British rapper, comedian and television presenter
Jimena Lindo: is a Peruvian actress, dancer and TV presenter
Laura Mae Lindo: is a Canadian politician
Mónica de Greiff Lindo: is a Colombian lawyer and former Minister of Justice of Colombia
Larry Lindo: is a Bermudian sailor
Christabel Lindo: is a Kenyan rugby sevens player
Nishy Lee Lindo: is a Costa Rican taekwondo practitioner
David Lindo: is a British author, also known as the Urban Birder
Jaine Lindo:  is a Sint Maartener footballer who plays for the Sint Maarten national team
Matilde Lindo: was a Nicaraguan feminist and activist
Screwdriver (musician): is a reggae artist active since the mid-1980s
Cinthya_Lindo Espinoza: former Minister of Development and Social Inclusion of Peru

References

Banking families
Jewish families
Sephardi families
Spanish and Portuguese Jews